Vermilion Falls is a waterfall on the Peace River in Alberta, Canada. It is the second largest waterfall in Canada by average flow rate after the Niagara Falls, and the largest entirely within the country. It is also the 6th widest waterfall in the world. The falls prevent the continuous navigation of the Peace River between its confluence with the Athabasca River and Hudson's Hope.

Description
The falls are navigable by small, flat-bottomed boats during high water. During all other times boaters have to dock below the falls and walk along an  trail running parallel to the south bank of the river before joining up with the river above the falls.

See also
List of waterfalls by flow rate
List of waterfalls of Canada

References

External links
Postcard of Vermilion Falls, H. Enida Olive Co'y Ltd Calgary, Canada, ca. 1910
Glass lantern slide photograph of Vermilion Chutes, ca. 1930

Waterfalls of Alberta